Loughborough Schools Foundation, formerly known as Loughborough Endowed Schools, is a collective of four selective, independent, private schools in the town of Loughborough, Leicestershire, UK. It comprises Loughborough Grammar School, an all-boys' secondary school, Loughborough High School, an all-girls' secondary school,  Fairfield Preparatory School, a co-educational preparatory school, and, since September 2015, Loughborough Amherst School (formerly Our Lady's Convent School). The schools are all located in short proximity to each other, with the first three sharing a campus.

See also
 Loughborough Grammar School
 Loughborough High School
 Fairfield Preparatory School
 Loughborough Amherst School

References

Loughborough
Private schools in Leicestershire